{{Infobox Law School
 | name           = Hamline University School of Law
 | image          = Hamline University School of Law.jpg
 | established    = 1972–2015 
 | type           = Private university
 | head           = Jean Holloway
 | city           = St. Paul
 | state          = Minnesota
 | country        = US
 | coordinates    = 
 | students       = 436<ref>[http://law.hamline.edu/uploadedFiles/Hamline_WWW/Offices_-_Admin/ASA/Documents/Hamline%20Law,%20Hamline%20University%20Profile%20-%20September-26.pdf "Hamline University Profile' Hamline University, P.11"] Accessed October 15, 2013.</ref>
 | faculty        = 
 | ranking        = Rank not published 
 | bar pass rate  = 91%
 | annual tuition = 36, 022 (full-time)$23,776 (part-time)
 | homepage       = https://www.hamline.edu/mhsl/
 | motto          = 
 | logo           = 
}}

Hamline University School of Law was a private law school affiliated with Hamline University in Saint Paul, Minnesota. The School of Law was founded in 1972 as the Midwestern School of Law by a group of legal professionals. In 1976, Midwestern School of Law was absorbed by Hamline University as its own School of Law.

On December 9, 2015, Hamline University School of Law merged into William Mitchell College of Law to form Mitchell Hamline School of Law.  Mitchell Hamline is also affiliated with Hamline University.

The School was accredited by the American Bar Association.

 Programs 
Hamline University School of Law offered full- and part-time legal education in pursuit of the Juris Doctor (J.D.) degree, as well as the Master of Law (LL.M.) degree for international lawyers. Dual degrees were available in Public Administration, Business Management, Nonprofit Management, Fine Arts in Creative Writing, and Organizational Leadership.

Employment, cost, and rankings 

Employment
According to Hamline's official employment disclosures required by the ABA, 44.8% of the Class of 2013 obtained full-time, long-term employment requiring a J.D. nine months after graduation. Hamline's Law School Transparency under-employment score was 20.5%, indicating the percentage of the Class of 2013 who are unemployed, pursuing an additional degree, or working in a non-professional, short-term, or part-time job nine months after graduation.

Cost
Tuition at Hamline for the 2014–2015 academic year was $37,204. The estimated cost of living off-campus for a Hamline law student was $19,883. Assuming no tuition increases, a typical three-year course of study costs $171,261, or $57,087 per year.

Rankings
For its 2014 rankings, U.S. News & World Reports "Best Law Schools" placed Hamline's overall law school program in a six-way tie at #126 among the 144 law schools it ranked. The 2014 rankings place the Alternative Dispute Resolution (ADR) program fourth among 14 schools, and Hamline's Health Law Institute was ranked 16th of 18 ranked schools."U.S. News & World Report Best Grad Schools, Law 2014, Healthcare Law". Box at bottom of page:  "See all 18 Ranked Schools". Accessed April 23, 2013. Both institutes continue at Mitchell Hamline School of Law. The four-year average of first-time bar passage rate for Hamline students was about 91%.

 Journals 
The school published two law journals. The Hamline Law Review was in the top 20% of the Most Cited Law Reviews . The Hamline Journal of Public Law and Policy provided a forum for discussions relating to public policy decisions of the executive, legislative, and judicial branches at all levels of government. Hamline law students staff the Hamline Law Review and the Hamline Journal of Public Law and Policy. With the merger of the schools, the Hamline Law Review merged with the William Mitchell Law Review to become the Mitchell Hamline Law Review. The Hamline Journal of Public Law and Policy merged with the William Mitchell Journal of Law and Practice to become the Mitchell Hamline Law Journal of Public Policy and Practive.

 Athletics 
The School of Law fielded student-run sports teams, particularly in ice hockey, where it competed in community leagues, intramural competition, and inter-law school competition among the Minnesota-based law schools. Hamline University School of Law and William Mitchell College of Law both fielded hockey teams which competed annually in the Res Ipsa'' Cup. These teams merged and continue to play under the name The Fighting Eelpouts, according to legend, originally coined for the William Mitchell hockey team by then-Governor Jesse Ventura.

Notable alumni
 Don Betzold, Minnesota State Senator 
 John Choi, Ramsey County, Minnesota Attorney
 Donovan Frank, Judge, U.S. District Court for the District of Minnesota 
 Michael Gableman, Justice, Wisconsin Supreme Court
 John Lesch, Minnesota State Representative 
 Paul Magers, news broadcaster
 Carly Melin, Minnesota State Representative
 Tim Purdon, 18th U.S. Attorney for the District of North Dakota
 Jasper Schneider, USDA Rural Development state director for North Dakota
 Eric Swanson, attorney
 Van Tran, California Assemblyman 
 Charles Wiger, Minnesota State Senator
 Rosalia "Sally" Olsen, Minnesota State Representative, Appellate Judge, Minnesota Workers' Compensation Court of Appeals (WCCA)

References

External links
Hamline University School of Law mainpage

Educational institutions established in 1972
Educational institutions disestablished in 2015
Mitchell Hamline School of Law
Law schools in Minnesota
Defunct law schools
1972 establishments in Minnesota
2015 disestablishments in Minnesota